Gregorič is a Slovenian surname. Notable people with the surname include:

 Kristjan Gregorič (born 1989), Slovenian cyclist
 Maks Gregorič (born 1985), Slovenian motorcycle speedway rider
 Miha Gregorič (born 1989), Slovenian footballer 

Slovene-language surnames